State Highway 42 (SH 42) is a state highway located in the northeastern portion of the Texas in Gregg and Rusk Counties.  This route was designated on December 12, 1962, over former SH 259 because of the creation of US 259 (which replaced cancelled SH 26) through Kilgore, which it intersected.

Previous routes

 SH 42 was originally proposed on April 22, 1919, as a route from Greenville to Marshall. On August 21, 1923, the northwest terminus extended north to Sherman, replacing a section of SH 11. The section of SH 42 from Alba to Marshall was cancelled; SH 42 was instead rerouted to end in Mineola. On January 21, 1924, the section from Alba to Mineola was cancelled. SH 42 was instead rerouted to end in Quitman. On October 20, 1924, another section was created from Gilmer to Marshall, creating a gap. On December 20, 1926, the gap was closed. On May 9, 1927, SH 42 was truncated to Whitewright. On March 19, 1930, the route was rerouted southeast back to Mineola, while the section from Gilmer to Marshall was renumbered SH 155, the section from Quitman to Gilmer was cancelled, but the section from Greenville to Whitewright was erroneously omitted from the state highway log, and the highway from Alba to Quitman was erroneously omitted from the state highway log, so had no number. On November 30, 1932, the section from Whitewright to Greenville was added back to the state highway log, and the road from Alba to Quitman was added to the state highway log as SH 182. On September 26, 1939, the entire remaining route was already part of U.S. Highway 69, so SH 42 was cancelled.

Counties and junctions

References

042
Transportation in Rusk County, Texas
Transportation in Gregg County, Texas